In 1859 Albert Bierstadt accompanied Frederick W. Lander on a western expedition.  On his return he painted a mountain landscape on a large  canvas, The Rocky Mountains, Lander's Peak .  Following the death of General Lander during the Civil War in 1862, Bierstadt named the peak Lander's Peak. The painting was completed in 1863 and sold in 1865 for $25,000.

References 

Mountains of Wyoming
Mountains of Sublette County, Wyoming